Mergellus is a genus of duck. The smew (Mergellus albellus) is the only living species, but an extinct species known as Mergellus mochanovi has also been described from Late Pleistocene deposits in the Yakutia region of Russia.

References

Bird genera
Bird genera with one living species
Taxa named by Prideaux John Selby
Anatinae